Aragon is a city in Polk County, Georgia, United States. As of the 2020 census, the city had a population of 1,440.

History
A post office has been in operation in Aragon since 1899. The city was named for local deposits of the mineral aragonite. Aragon incorporated in 1914.

The city was home to Aragon mill which is now closed and abandoned  An EF3 tornado struck the northern part of the city on March 15, 2008, claiming two lives.

Geography

Aragon is located at  (34.045252, -85.057384).

Demographics

2020 census

As of the 2020 United States census, there were 1,440 people, 505 households, and 357 families residing in the city.

2010 census
As of the census of 2010 thru 2017, there were 1,252 people, 399 households, and 284 families residing in the city. The population density was 1150.15 people/mi2(444.07 people/km). The racial makeup of the city was 97.21% White, 0.67% African American, 0.87% Native American, 0.10% Asian, 0.38% from other races, and 0.77% from two or more races. Hispanic or Latino of any race were 1.73% of the population.

There were 399 households, out of which 35.3% had children under the age of 18 living with them, 55.6% were married couples living together, 10.5% had a female householder with no husband present, and 28.6% were non-families. 23.3% of all households were made up of individuals, and 9.3% had someone living alone who was 65 years of age or older.  The average household size was 2.60 and the average family size was 3.08.

In the city, the population was spread out, with 27.1% under the age of 18, 11.0% from 18 to 24, 29.1% from 25 to 44, 21.7% from 45 to 64, and 11.2% who were 65 years of age or older.  The median age was 34 years. For every 100 females, there were 92.8 males.  For every 100 females age 18 and over, there were 92.6 males.

The median income for a household in the city was $31,053, and the median income for a family was $39,167. Males had a median income of $28,250 versus $21,406 for females. The per capita income for the city was $15,084.  About 11.0% of families and 17.5% of the population were below the poverty line, including 22.9% of those under age 18 and 11.1% of those age 65 or over.

References

Cities in Georgia (U.S. state)
Cities in Polk County, Georgia
1899 establishments in Georgia (U.S. state)
Populated places established in 1899